Ina Bauer may refer to:

 Ina Bauer (figure skater) (1941–2014), German figure skater
 Ina Bauer (element), the skating move she invented